The Plough and the Stars is a 1937 American drama film directed by John Ford and starring Barbara Stanwyck and Preston Foster. It is based on the play of the same name written by Seán O'Casey.

Plot
Nora Clitheroe runs a rooming house in Dublin while trying to avoid the political turmoil raging around her in revolutionary Ireland. However, she discovers that her husband Jack has joined a militia of Irish rebels seeking to oust the British from Ireland. Nora fears for Jack's safety and begs him to keep his distance from the revolutionary forces. Despite Jack's promises to Nora that he will cease his participation with the rebels, he  becomes a commander with the Irish Citizen Army as it plans to occupy the Dublin General Post Office as part of the Easter Rising.

Cast

 Barbara Stanwyck as Nora Clitheroe
 Preston Foster as Jack Clitheroe
 Barry Fitzgerald as Fluther Good
 Denis O'Dea as The Young Covey
 F. J. McCormick as Capt. Brennan
 Una O'Connor as Maggie Gogan
 Arthur Shields as Padraig Pearse
 Moroni Olsen as James Connolly
 J. M. Kerrigan as Peter Flynn
 Bonita Granville as Mollser Gogan
 Erin O'Brien-Moore as Rosie Redmond
 Neil Fitzgerald as Lt. Langon
 Robert Homans as Timmy the Barman
 Brandon Hurst as Sgt. Tinley
 Cyril McLaglen as Cpl. Stoddard
 Wesley Barry as Sniper
 D'Arcy Corrigan as Priest
 Mary Gordon as Woman at Barricades
 Doris Lloyd as Woman at Barricades

Production

Casting
Director John Ford wished to reuse the entire cast of the original Abbey Theatre play for the film, but RKO insisted upon proven stars for the leading roles and cast Barbara Stanwyck for the lead female role as well as a supporting cast of mostly Irish actors, including some who had appeared in the play.

MGM had originally agreed to lend Spencer Tracy to RKO for the lead role, but just before filming was to begin, Tracy withdrew from the project "because the part wasn't good enough." MGM had also become hesitant following Tracy's breakout success in the 1936 films Fury and San Francisco. To remain on schedule, RKO swiftly cast Preston Foster in place of Tracy.

Stanwyck was dismayed about her rather minor speaking part in the film and, during rehearsals, told Ford, "I can walk through this part." Ford used her remark derisively against her throughout filming.

Arthur Shields, who plays Padraig Pearse in the film, participated in the actual Easter Rising rebellion as a youth.

Filming
The play as originally presented on the Dublin stage contained a great deal of broad satire approaching farce, but the comedic aspects were removed entirely for the screenplay.

Production of the film began on July 6, 1936.

Ford prohibited the actors from wearing makeup in order to deliver a sense of realism. Stanwyck at first refused to appear without makeup but relented.

Ford was enraged with RKO over the film's casting and the softening of the story's political message. After the film's release, Ford complained that the studio "completely ruined the damned thing."

Reception 
In a contemporary review for The New York Times, critic Frank S. Nugent called the film "a freely translated version which has realized part of the play's intent but missed more of it" and wrote:Mr. O'Casey was not interested in glorifying the Easter rebellion of 1916; he thought it tragic and foolhardy and pitiful. He could not pretend that all the men and women of Dublin were heroic martyrs to a magnificent cause; he recognized sardonically that, while some went out to orate, to fight and to die, others dived from the shelter of their tenement warrens to the shelter of their pubs, bickering and carping, stooping to a bit of plunder when they had the chance. The RKO-Radio edition has softened Mr. O'Casey's ironical thrusts by seeing no more in his play than appeared on its surface.

See also
 The Informer (1935 film), a film also directed by John Ford and set in revolutionary Ireland

References

External links

1937 drama films
1937 films
American black-and-white films
American drama films
American films based on plays
Films based on works by Seán O'Casey
Films directed by John Ford
Films produced by Cliff Reid
Films set in Dublin (city)
Films with screenplays by Dudley Nichols
Films set in hotels
Films set in the 1910s
Irish War of Independence films
RKO Pictures films
1930s English-language films
1930s American films